Magic Moment may refer to:

Music

Albums
 Cee Lo's Magic Moment, album by Cee Lo
 Magic Moment, album by A'Cappella ExpreSSS
 Magic Moment, album by Wakana
 Magic Moments from "The Gay Life", album by Nelson Riddle of music from Arthur Schwartz and Howard Dietz's musical The Gay Life, or the title track

Songs
 "Magic Moment", a song by DJ Sammy from the album Life Is Just a Game
 "Magic Moment", a song by The Stan Kenton Orchestra from the extended version of the album Sophisticated Approach
 "Magic Moment", a song by Loona
 "Magic Moments", song with music by Burt Bacharach and lyrics by Hal David, performed by Perry Como

Film and television 
 Magic Moments Motion Pictures, an Indian Bengali-language television serial and film production company
 "Magischen Moment" (Magic Moment), a television episode of the music competition series  Deutschland sucht den Superstar

Other uses 
 Magic Moment, a novel by Martha Cecilia
 Magic Moment, a gameplay feature in the theme park attraction Who Wants to Be a Millionaire – Play It!
 Magic Moment, a show in the Land of Oz theme park
 "The Magic Moment", a painting by country music artist Ronnie McDowell
 EuroLeague Magic Moment of the Season
 Magic Moment, annual sports award given in snooker, see 2010–11 snooker season

See also 
 This Magic Moment (disambiguation)